Anthony Cecil Eden Quainton (born April 4, 1934) is an American diplomat who served as the United States ambassador to the Central African Empire, Nicaragua, Kuwait, and Peru.

Early life and education 
He was born in Seattle and educated at St. Michaels University School in Victoria, Canada. He earned a Bachelor of Arts degree from Princeton University and a Bachelor of Literature from Oxford University, where he studied as a Marshall Scholar.

Career 
Quainton joined the United States Foreign Service in 1959. As a Foreign Service Officer, he was posted to Sydney 1959–62, to Karachi 1963, to Rawalpindi 1964–66, and to New Delhi 1966–69. He spent 1969–72 at the United States Department of State in Washington, D.C., as the senior political officer for India in the Bureau of Near East and South Asian Affairs. He then spent 1972–73 as a political officer at the U.S. Embassy, Paris. From 1973 through 1976, he was deputy chief of mission in Kathmandu. In 1976, President Gerald Ford nominated Quainton as United States ambassador to the Central African Empire. Ambassador Quainton presented his credentials on February 20, 1976, and held this post until June 9, 1978.

He then became the coordinator for Counterterrorism. During this time, he oversaw the task force in charge of dealing with the 1980 Dominican Republic Embassy siege in Bogotá by M-19 guerrillas. He held this post until 1981 and was then named United States ambassador to Nicaragua by President Ronald Reagan, presenting his credentials on March 26, 1982, and serving there until May 6, 1984. Reagan then appointed Quainton United States ambassador to Kuwait, a post which he held from September 1984 to August 1987. Quainton returned to the United States in September 1987, serving as Deputy inspector general of the Department of State from September 1987 to November 1989.

Newly-inaugurated President George H. W. Bush named Quainton United States ambassador to Peru. He presented his credentials on December 11, 1989, and served until September 16, 1992.

After his tenure in a Peru, Bush then nominated Quainton to be assistant secretary of state for diplomatic security, an office he held from September 23, 1992, until December 29, 1995. President Bill Clinton then named him director general of the Foreign Service which Quainton held from December 29, 1995, to August 22, 1997.

In 1997, Quainton left government service and joined the Una Chapman Cox Foundation. He then became president and CEO of the National Policy Association. Since 2003, he has been the Distinguished Diplomat-in-Residence at the American University School of International Service.

Personal life 
While in England, he married a fellow Marshall Scholar, Susan Long, in 1957. He spent 1958–59 working as a research assistant at St Antony's College, Oxford.

References

 State Dept. Archived Biography
 Faculty Page at the School of International Service

External links

 
1934 births
United States Assistant Secretaries of State
Living people
People from Seattle
Princeton University alumni
Marshall Scholars
Ambassadors of the United States to Nicaragua
Ambassadors of the United States to the Central African Republic
Ambassadors of the United States to Kuwait
Ambassadors of the United States to Peru
American chief executives
Alumni of Nuffield College, Oxford
Alumni of Christ Church, Oxford
United States Foreign Service personnel
Directors General of the United States Foreign Service
20th-century American diplomats